The following is a list of countries by car imports.

By value 
Data is for 2021, in billions of United States dollars. The top fifteen countries are listed:

See also
List of countries by car exports

References

Sources
Central Intelligence Agency, The World Factbook Field Listing: Exports – Commodities. Accessed on June 6, 2022.
International Trade Centre, Trade Map. Accessed on June 6, 2022.
Investopedia, Net Exports Definition. Accessed on June 6, 2022.

car imports